Lucien Choury (26 March 1898 – 6 May 1987) was a French cyclist. He won the gold medal in Men's tandem along with Jean Cugnot at the 1924 Summer Olympics

References

1898 births
1987 deaths
French male cyclists
Olympic cyclists of France
Olympic gold medalists for France
Cyclists at the 1924 Summer Olympics
Olympic medalists in cycling
People from Courbevoie
Medalists at the 1924 Summer Olympics
French track cyclists
Sportspeople from Hauts-de-Seine
Cyclists from Île-de-France